Maslak Pavilion is a former imperial Ottoman pavilion located in Istanbul, Turkey. It was constructed during the reign of Sultan Abdülaziz (1861-1876). It is under the administration of the Turkish Directorate of National Palaces.

Literature 
 Erdal Eren, Semra Karakaşlı, Ezel İlter. Maslak Pavilion. TBMM, Istanbul, 1994.

External links 
 Directorate of National Palaces | Maslak Pavilion

Ottoman palaces in Istanbul
Museums in Istanbul
Tourism in Istanbul